Weprin is a surname. Notable people with the surname include:

Ben Weprin (born 1978), American businessman
David Weprin (born 1956), American lawyer and politician
Mark Weprin (born 1961), American politician, son of Saul
Saul Weprin (1927–1994), American attorney and politician